Massachusetts House of Representatives' 17th Essex district in the United States is one of 160 legislative districts included in the lower house of the Massachusetts General Court. It covers part of Essex County. Democrat Frank Moran of Lawrence has represented the district since 2013. Candidates for this district seat in the 2020 Massachusetts general election include Marianela Rivera.

Locales represented
The district includes the following localities:
 part of Andover
 part of Lawrence
 part of Methuen

The current district geographic boundary overlaps with those of the Massachusetts Senate's 1st Essex and 2nd Essex and Middlesex districts.

Former locale
The district previously covered part of Lynn, circa 1872.

Representatives
 Benj. Edwards Jr., circa 1858 
 Gorham P. Sargent, circa 1859 
 Daniel P. Stimpson, circa 1888 
 Chauncey Pepin, circa 1920 
 A. David Rodham, circa 1975 
 Susan Tucker, circa 1983
 Gary Coon
 Barry Finegold
 Paul Adams
 Frank A. Moran, 2013-current

See also
 List of Massachusetts House of Representatives elections
 Other Essex County districts of the Massachusetts House of Representatives: 1st, 2nd, 3rd, 4th, 5th, 6th, 7th, 8th, 9th, 10th, 11th, 12th, 13th, 14th, 15th, 16th, 18th
 Essex County districts of the Massachusett Senate: 1st, 2nd, 3rd; 1st Essex and Middlesex; 2nd Essex and Middlesex
 List of Massachusetts General Courts
 List of former districts of the Massachusetts House of Representatives

Images

References

Further reading

External links
 Ballotpedia
  (State House district information based on U.S. Census Bureau's American Community Survey).
 League of Women Voters of Andover / North Andover

House
Government of Essex County, Massachusetts